This list of phylogenetics software is a compilation of computational phylogenetics software used to produce phylogenetic trees. Such tools are commonly used in comparative genomics, cladistics, and bioinformatics. Methods for estimating phylogenies include neighbor-joining, maximum parsimony (also simply referred to as parsimony), UPGMA, Bayesian phylogenetic inference, maximum likelihood and distance matrix methods.

List

See also 
List of phylogenetic tree visualization software

References

External links 
Complete list of Institut Pasteur phylogeny webservers
ExPASy List of phylogenetics programs
A very comprehensive list of phylogenetic tools (reconstruction, visualization, etc.)
Another list of evolutionary genetics software
A list of phylogenetic software provided by the Zoological Research Museum A. Koenig 
MicrobeTrace available at https://github.com/CDCgov/MicrobeTrace/wiki

 
Genetics databases
Phylo
Phylogenetics
Phylogenetics